"Light of Love" is a 1974 single by the British glam rock band T. Rex. The track is taken from the album Bolan's Zip Gun whilst its B-side, "Explosive Mouth", features on the 1974 album Zinc Alloy and the Hidden Riders of Tomorrow. In the US, both songs appeared on the US only compilation album Light of Love. Rolling Stone magazine's Ken Barnes praised the single's "upbeat" and "economical" sound in a 1974 review, claiming Bolan's new output to be "fresh and attractive".

"Light of Love" was produced by Marc Bolan; it was the first T. Rex single on which the production did not involve Tony Visconti.

The single was in the UK charts for a total of five weeks, peaking at No. 22, and is notable as being the first T. Rex single to miss the Top 20.
It appeared as the closing track on the end credits for the Vince Vaughn film, Delivery Man (2013).

References

1974 singles
T. Rex (band) songs
Songs written by Marc Bolan
Song recordings produced by Marc Bolan
EMI Records singles
1974 songs